Shad Mahal (also Romanized as Shād Maḩal) is a village in Dasht-e Sar Rural District, Dabudasht District, Amol County, Mazandaran Province, Iran. At the 2006 census, its population was 4,065, in 1,095 families.

References 

Populated places in Amol County